Heartbeats is a 2010 Canadian romantic drama film written and directed by Xavier Dolan. It follows the story of two friends who both fall in love with the same man. It premiered in the Un Certain Regard section of the 2010 Cannes Film Festival.

Plot
Francis and Marie first meet Nicolas at a dinner party, where they both feign lack of interest in him. Over the next couple of weeks, the three form a close friendship, meeting up regularly and even sleeping together in the same bed. However, it is clear that both Marie and Francis have an interest in Nicolas beyond friendship. Francis is unhappy when Nicolas invites Marie to the theater. Marie is visibly disappointed when she arrives at a Vietnamese restaurant with Nicolas after the play, finds Francis dining with several friends, and watches Nicolas take a seat at the end of the table furthest from her. Both interpret Nicolas' actions as signs of intimacy and affection: Nicolas eats a cherry from Francis' hand; Nicolas tells Marie he loves her and also loves Francis. Their feelings lead to competition for Nicolas' affections, evidenced by their rivalry over the gifts they buy for his birthday.

The relationship culminates in a trip to the vacation home of Nicolas' aunt. Marie becomes jealous when Nicolas feeds Francis a marshmallow, telling him to eat it slowly like a 'striptease', and she goes to bed early. The next morning, she wakes up alone and observes the two frolicking together in the distance. She decides to leave, but Francis chases after her and the two end up wrestling on the ground. Nicolas is not impressed and decides to leave, saying they can love him or leave him. On returning from the trip, neither sees Nicolas. Each leaves him a voicemail message and Marie writes him a love letter. Eventually, Francis meets Nicolas and pours out his feelings, telling him he loves him and wants to kiss him. Nicolas responds: "How could you think I was gay?", leaving Francis devastated. Later, Marie catches up with Nicolas in the street and first tells him the letter she sent was meant for a female friend accidentally switched with an academic essay she intended for him. Nicolas asks Marie if this female friend is her lover or her ex, which Marie confusedly denies. As Nicolas goes to leave, claiming to have left something on the stove, she asks how he would feel if she had intended the poem for him. He says he would still have something on the stove.

After a year, Francis and Marie have re-established their friendship. At a party they repulse an attempt by Nicolas to greet them. In the final scene, they both catch the eye of another party guest and together head for him.

Cast

 Xavier Dolan as Francis
 Monia Chokri as Marie
 Niels Schneider as Nicolas
 Anne Dorval as Désirée
 Anne-Élisabeth Bossé as Jeune femme 1
 Olivier Morin as Jeune homme 1
 Magalie Lépine-Blondeau as Jeune femme 2
 Éric Bruneau as Jeune homme 2
 Gabriel Lessard as Jeune homme 3
 Bénédicte Décary as Jeune femme 3
 François Bernier as Baise 1
 Benoît McGinnis as Baise 2
 François Xavier Dufour as Baise 3
 Anthony Huneault as Antonin
 Patricia Dulasne as Coiffeuse
 Jody Hargreaves as Jody
 Clara Palardy as Clara
 Minou Petrowski as Caissière
 Perrettte Sounder as Coiffeuse
 Sophie Desmarais as Rockabill
 Marie-Christine Cormier as Barmaid
 Louis Garrel (special appearance) as L'invité à la soirée finale

Reception
On review aggregator Rotten Tomatoes, the film holds an approval rating of 73% based on 73 reviews, with an average rating of 6.89/10. The website's critics consensus reads: "An art film to the max, Heartbeats intriguing and appealing premise is sometimes buried by director Xavier Dolan's filmmaking flourishes." On Metacritic, the film has a weighted average score of 70 out of 100, based on 21 critics, indicating "generally favorable reviews". A New York Times critic wrote that compared to Dolan's first film Heartbeats "takes style even more seriously, both in its allusive execution–he draws giddily from things like the Nouvelle Vague and Wong Kar-wai–and its subject: self-fashioning and teasing, unfulfilled desire."

Accolades

References

External links
 
 
 
 
 

2010 films
2010 independent films
2010 LGBT-related films
2010 romantic drama films
2010s English-language films
2010s French-language films
Canadian independent films
Canadian LGBT-related films
Canadian romantic drama films
English-language Canadian films
Films directed by Xavier Dolan
Films set in Montreal
Films shot in Montreal
Gay-related films
LGBT-related romantic drama films
French-language Canadian films
2010s Canadian films